The Nearly Complete and Utter History of Everything is a collection of television comedy sketches, produced in 1999, broadcast in two parts on 2 and 4 January 2000 on BBC One. Based on well-known historical events, it took its title and concept from the 1969 London Weekend Television series The Complete and Utter History of Britain.

Cast

The Ages of Man
A version of the class sketch which had previously been broadcast as part of the BBC Millennium programme on 31 December 1999.
Ronnie Barker – Renaissance Man
Ronnie Corbett – Medieval Man
Stephen Fry – Modern Man

1066
The Battle of Hastings staged and described in the style of a modern football match, a version of a sketch from The Complete and Utter History of Britain.
Clive Anderson – Archbishop of Canterbury 
Ray Clemence – Ray Clemence the Younger
George Cohen – Master George Cohen
James Fleet – William of Normandy
Archie Gemmill – Archie Gemmill, currently in exile
David Gower – Lord Gower
Ricky Grover – Aberforth
Alan Hansen – Lord Alan Hansen
Geoff Hurst – Sir Geoffrey of Hurst
Gary Lineker – Lord Gary Lineker
Rory McGrath – King Harold II
Peter Osgood – Squire Peter Osgoode
Martin Peters – Lord Martin Peters
Steve Punt – French soldier
Peter Shilton – Peter of Shilton
Rupert Vansittart – Bishop of Cardiff

Scott of the Antarctic
A parody of Scott of the Antarctic.
Amanda Holden – Geordie's girlfriend
Bob Mortimer – Geordie
Vic Reeves – Captain Scott

The First Spin Doctor
Martin Clunes – King Henry V
Angus Deayton – Lord Mandelson
Martin Trenaman

Treaty of Westphalia
Patrick Barlow – Advisor
Robert Bathurst – English Ambassador
James Dreyfus – Swedish Ambassador
Stephen Fry – Ambassador
Hugh Laurie – French Ambassador

Marriage Guidance
Brian Blessed – King Henry VIII
Jack Dee – Marriage guidance counsellor
Julia Sawalha – Catherine Parr

The Nice-But-Dim Family
Adam Blackwood – Norman
Richard Briers – Highway robbery victim
Tim Brooke-Taylor – Earl of Sandwich
Peter Davison – Duke of Wellington
Harry Enfield – Tim Norse-But-Dim / Sir Timothy Nice-Butte D'imme / Sir Timothy the Lionbrain / Dim Turpin / Major-General Sir Timothy Nice-But-Dim / Midshipman Nice-But-Dim
Jessica Stevenson – Woman with Black Death Victim 
Natasha Little – Lady Lionbrain
Spike Milligan – Admiral Lord Nelson
Nigel Planer – Lord Cardigan
Steve Punt – Lord Tampax
Barbara Windsor – Highway robbery victim

Philosophy of a Hairdresser
Thora Hird – Ida
Victoria Wood – Moira

Body Zone
Joan Bakewell – Herself
Dawn French – Egg
Jennifer Saunders – Egg

A Victorian Evening
James Fleet – Mr Parsons
Geraldine McNulty – Mrs Richards
Trevor Peacock – Colonel
Caroline Quentin – Lady Butterworth

Explorers Explorers Explorers
Robert Bathurst – Francis Drake
Peter Davison – Ferdinand Magellan
Angus Deayton – Sir Walter Raleigh

Holby Village Hospital
Jack Dee – Dr Barber
Gary Olsen – Mr Baker

Early British Comedy
Matthew Ashforde – Reginald
Helena Bonham Carter – Lily
Neil Morrissey – Director
Caroline Quentin – Marcia Bournemouth
Richard Wilson – Monty DeLauncy

When Columbo discovered America
Gareth Hale – Christopher Columbo
Norman Pace – King Ferdinand

Looking Forwards
Lenny Henry – Deakus 
Clive Mantle – Dr Mike Barrat

External links

 "The Nearly Complete And Utter History Of Everything", Memorable TV.

1999 films
1990s historical comedy films
British historical films
Cultural depictions of William the Conqueror
Cultural depictions of Henry VIII
Cultural depictions of Robert Falcon Scott
Cultural depictions of Francis Drake
Cultural depictions of Walter Raleigh
Cultural depictions of Ferdinand Magellan
Cultural depictions of Horatio Nelson
Cultural depictions of Arthur Wellesley, 1st Duke of Wellington
Films set in the 11th century
Films set in the 15th century
Films set in Tudor England
Films set in the 1640s
Films set in the 1910s
1999 comedy films
1990s English-language films
1990s British films